Cyril is a town in Caddo County, Oklahoma, United States. The population was 1,059 at the 2010 census.

Geography
Cyril is located in southeastern Caddo County at  (34.897969, -98.202843). U.S. Route 277 passes through the town, leading northeast  to Chickasha and southwest  to Lawton.

Utilities
Telephone, Internet, and Digital TV Services is provided by Hilliary Communications.

Demographics

As of the census of 2000, there were 1,168 people, 438 households and 307 families residing in the town. There were 523 housing units at an average density of 908.3 per square mile (348.2/km2). The racial makeup of the town was 87.16% White, 0.17% African American, 9.42% Native American, 0.17% Asian, 0.51% from other races, and 2.57% from two or more races. Hispanic or Latino of any race were 2.74% of the population.

There were 438 households, of which 34.2% had children under the age of 18 living with them, 53.2% were married couples living together, 13.2% had a female householder with no husband present, and 29.9% were non-families. 28.3% of all households were made up of individuals, and 16.0% had someone living alone who was 65 years of age or older. The average household size was 2.55 and the average family size was 3.14.

In the town, the population was spread out, with 29.4% under the age of 18, 6.8% from 18 to 24, 25.8% from 25 to 44, 17.0% from 45 to 64, and 21.1% who were 65 years of age or older. The median age was 35 years. For every 100 females, there were 84.8 males. For every 100 females age 18 and over, there were 76.7 males.

The median income for a household in the town was $27,772, and the median income for a family was $33,750. Males had a median income of $29,500 versus $16,563 for females. The per capita income for the town was $14,227. About 16.6% of families and 20.5% of the population were below the poverty line, including 30.7% of those under age 18 and 10.6% of those age 65 or over.

History
On August 25, 1901, Louise (probably called Cyril) Lookingglass, the infant daughter of Bayard (Monapahrah) and Laura (Tit-tah-ter-way) Lookingglass, was allotted  of land that would become the Cyril townsite. Louise Lookingglass died in 1903. Bayard Lookingglass sold one-half of the allotment to Mr. and Mrs. Pierson on July 26, 1907. The Piersons sold the land to the Cyril Townsite and Development Company on September 10, 1907.

Although there is some dispute, the Cyril Station appears to have been named circa 1902 after Bayard and Laura Lookingglasses' daughter when they granted the railroad permission to build a section house next to the railroad stop. Some believed that the town of Cyril was named after the Cyril Station of the St. Louis-San Francisco Railroad. However a diligent search of all sources including Frisco Railroad, found no supporting evidence.

The townsite was surveyed, plotted out and dedicated in September 1907. Construction began in early 1908 and by April there were 200 inhabitants, 3 hardware stores, 3 grocery stores, a general tin and pump house, restaurant, rooming house, pool hall, two barber shops, blacksmith shop, lumberyard, feed yard and feed mill.

The town was the site of an oil refinery from the early 1920s until it was closed in 1984. During that time, the refinery was operated by Anderson-Prichard Refining, APCO, and later Oklahoma Refining. It was the major economic driver for the town, employing 160 people at the time of closure. An unsuccessful attempt was made in the early 1990s to restart part of the refinery. As of 2010, the refinery had been demolished and the site was a Superfund environmental cleanup site.

Notable people
Jay Snider - Poet Laureate of Oklahoma (2023-2024)

References

External links
 https://web.archive.org/web/20170921132058/http://cyril.k12.ok.us/

Towns in Caddo County, Oklahoma
Towns in Oklahoma